Enneapterygius pallidoserialis, the pale white-spotted triplefin, is a species of triplefin blenny in the genus Enneapterygius. It was described by Ronald Fricke in 1997. This species occurs in the western Pacific Ocean where it has been recorded from Indonesia, Japan, Malaysia, the Federated States of Micronesia, Philippines, Solomon Islands; Taiwan, Vanuatu and Vietnam.

References

pallidoserialis
Fish described in 1997